Olinda Creek (Woiwurrung: Gnurt-bille-worrun) is a major tributary of the Yarra River in Victoria, Australia.  Its origins are in the Dandenong Ranges, and it is notable for passing through the settlement of Lilydale (now a suburb of Melbourne) before joining with the Yarra near Coldstream.

History and Toponymy 
When Europeans first entered this area of southern Australia, they moved up the valley of the Olinda Creek (then called Running Creek because it was a perennial stream).  The formal naming process began with the survey of Lilydale township by John Hardy in 1859–60. At the same time that he named Lilydale, Hardy renamed the creek ‘Olinda’ after Alice Olinda Hodgkinson, daughter of Deputy Surveyor-General Clement Hodgkinson.

A major dam wall was built to create Silvan Reservoir in 1926. This stopped water flowing into Olinda Creek at the northern end of the reservoir. A second, minor dam wall at the southern end stops water flowing into Emerald Creek.

Lillydale Lake
Between 1988 and 1990 a dam was built on the creek just south of Lilydale, creating Lillydale Lake. The lake provides flood mitigation to areas downstream. It incorporates extensive wetlands and is a community recreation facility.

References

Melbourne Water catchment
Rivers of Greater Melbourne (region)
Tributaries of the Yarra River